The Great Quest by Charles Boardman Hawes is a children's adventure novel which was a Newbery Honor recipient in 1922. Illustrated by George Varian, it was published by The Atlantic Monthly Press in 1921.

Plot
The story opens in fictional Topham, Massachusetts, in 1826. After the man Cornelius "Neal" Gleazen unexpectedly returns to town, he involves childhood friend Seth Woods and Seth's nephew, twenty-year-old protagonist Josiah "Joe" Woods, in a dangerous sea journey to retrieve a hidden treasure. Accompanying them are Seth's two store-clerks, Arnold Lamont and Sim Muzzy, and farmer Abraham Guptil, on whose mortgage Neal forced Seth to foreclose in order to raise money to outfit the expedition.

When the travelers reach Cuba it is revealed that there is no hidden treasure, and that Neal's actual intent is to kidnap native Africans from Guinea to sell as slaves. However, it is not until they reach Africa that Joe, Seth, and the others find an opportunity to take control of the expedition from Neal. While in Africa, they rescue from danger a white missionary's daughter, who is accompanied by a native African slave or servant (his status is unclear) belonging to the Fantee nation. Both of these accompany them back to Massachusetts via South America. Arnold Lamont, however, stays behind in Valparaiso.

Awards
The Great Quest received a special runner-up citation from the Newbery committee in 1922, the first year the Newbery was awarded. According to Barbara Elleman in The Newbery and Caldecott Awards, originally the award was based on votes by a selected jury of Children's Librarian Section officers. Hendrik van Loon's book The Story of Mankind won the award with 163 votes out of the 212 cast. The Great Quest came in second with twenty-two votes. All previous runner-up citations were converted to Honor Awards in 1971.

References

External links
The Great Quest

1921 American novels
Children's historical novels
American children's novels
Newbery Honor-winning works
Novels set in Massachusetts
Fiction set in 1826
Novels set in the 1820s
1921 children's books